is a railway station on the Amagi Line located in Tachiarai, Fukuoka Prefecture, Japan. It is operated by the Amagi Railway, a third sector public-private partnership corporation.

Lines
All Amagi Line trains stop at the station.

Layout
The station consists of a side platform serving a single bi-directional track. There is no station building but an enclosed shelter is provided on the platform for waiting passengers. Access to the platform is by a flight of steps or a ramp. A bike shed is provided by the station entrance and parking for cars is available.

Platforms

Adjacent stations

History
On 1 April 1986, control of the station was handed over to the Amagi Railway.

Surrounding area 
 Shiroyama Park
 Tachiarai Park
 Maruyama Hospital
 Kikuchi Post Office
 Kikuchi Nursery
 Kikuchi Elementary School
 Mammy's Tachiarai shop
 Drug Store Mori Tachiarai shop
 Japan National Route 500
 Oita Expressway

References

Railway stations in Fukuoka Prefecture
Railway stations in Japan opened in 1939